Tyrolean Jets & Services (TJS) was established in 1978 as Austria's first executive air operator, operating business jets and management jets for Swarovski's Corporate Flight Department and for clients on the worldwide air charter market.

History
The company was founded in 1958 as Aircraft Innsbruck, by Christian Schwemberger-Swarovski and Gernot Langes-Swarovski. The division operated business flights. At this time Innsbruck had scheduled services to Zurich only.

In 1978, the firm was renamed and restructured as Tyrolean Airways, combining airline, air ambulance and business travel operations.

In April 1980, a de Havilland Canada Dash 7 flew the first scheduled flight from Innsbruck to Vienna and Zurich. In the first year in business, 38,500 passengers took the flight, which justified a second machine from May 1981. In 1985 Tyrolean Airways operated a twin-engine de Havilland Canada Dash 8 with 37 seats and the company was renamed Tyrolean Jet Service.

Tyrolean Air Ambulance was divided into the Tyrol Air Ambulance and the helicopter division Heliair which was split off.

In 1988 Tyrolean became a public company and Leipnik Lundenburger AG acquired 25%. ÖAMTC acquired Heliair and in 1995, Austrian Airlines acquired the scheduled flight operations. Thereafter TJS focused exclusively on business travel.

Fleet 

As of 2010, the Tyrolean Jet Services fleet consists of the following aircraft:

 1 Bombardier Global Express
 1 Beechcraft B200GT King Air
 2 Cessna Citation VII
 1 Embraer Phenom 300
 1 Gulfstream G550

References

External links

 

Airlines of Austria
Airlines established in 1958
Companies based in Innsbruck
1958 establishments in Austria